The Association of Trust Schools (ATS) is an organisation of independent primary and secondary schools in Zimbabwe that was founded in 1962. Each of these schools are run by their own Board of Governors and are not for profit entities. The Heads of ATS schools are eligible for membership in the CHISZ. There are 66 schools in the ATS.

History
In 1962 CHISZ was formed with nine member headmasters: those of Arundel, Bishopslea, Chisipite, Eagle, Falcon, Peterhouse, St. Peter's, Springvale, Whitestone and Bernard Mizeki College. Their purpose was mutual support and encouragement. By the mid-1970s, twenty-four schools attended the Conference. A dip then followed leading up to independence with only nine members attending in 1981. However, the Independence War years had led to a number of member schools closing down, including two of its founder members (Eagle and St. Peter’s), while two other founder member schools closed but did re-open (Whitestone and Springvale).

When government schools opened up to multi-racial classes post-independence, those people who had turned to independent schools chose government schools rather than high fee-paying independent schools as what they were being offered was much the same. However, by 1983, the demand for independent schools had gained pace again – many more new schools were founded, nearly all co-educational schools, while nearly all the founding members of CHISZ had been single-sex schools. In 1983 six new independent schools were started; from 1983 to 1986 nineteen more were founded.

Member schools have received criticism from parents and Zimbabwe government Minister of Education Lazarus Dokora for charging illegally excessive non-refundable acceptance fees and increasing tuition despite "atrocious" academic results.

In 2015, sixty-six schools are members of the ATS, with twenty-four at Secondary level and forty-two at Primary with over 23,000 students enrolled and over 800 teachers employed.

EXCO
EXCO is the Standing Committee of ATS, made up of members of the Conference, elected annually by the members at the AGM.

List of EXCO Chairs

List of ATS member schools

Primary schools

Secondary schools

See also

 Conference of Heads of Independent Schools in Zimbabwe

References

External links
 ATS CHISZ Official website

Associations of schools
Private and independent school organizations
Educational organisations based in Zimbabwe
Education in Zimbabwe

Organizations established in 1962
1962 establishments in the Federation of Rhodesia and Nyasaland